

The Logic Lane covered bridge is a small covered bridge at the High Street end of Logic Lane, within University College, Oxford, England.

The bridge was designed by the Oxford architect Harry Wilkinson Moore (1850–1915) and was completed in 1904. It links the older Radcliffe Quad buildings with the newer Durham Buildings, built in 1903. Oxford City Council was against the scheme, since Logic Lane was officially a bridleway, but the court judged in favour of the College—so the bridge was built.

See also
Bridge of Sighs, another better-known covered bridge in Oxford at Hertford College.

References

External links
University College, Bridge, Oxford, Oxfordshire 1906 photograph by Henry Taunt from English Heritage

Covered bridge, Logic Lane
Bridges in Oxford
Covered bridges in England
Buildings and structures of the University of Oxford
Bridges completed in 1904